Mrs. Kasha Davis is the stage name of Edward P. Popil, Jr., an American drag queen, actor and television personality from Scranton, Pennsylvania. She is best known for competing on the seventh season of RuPaul's Drag Race. After appearing on the reality television show, Mrs. Kasha Davis has toured internationally, has released several musical singles, and performs regularly in theaters and clubs, as well as on television and in film.

Career 
Based in Rochester, Mrs. Kasha Davis frequently performs with long-time collaborators and fellow RuPaul's Drag Race alums Pandora Boxx and Darienne Lake. She has performed "Bosom Buddies," a two-woman show with Darienne Lake nationally and internationally. Prior to Drag Race, Mrs. Kasha Davis starred in and co-wrote the film Mrs. Kasha Davis: The Life of an International Housewife Celebrity with Michael Steck (Pandora Boxx). For fourteen years Mrs. Kasha Davis has co-written and performed with fellow Rochester-based drag queen Aggy Dune in "Big Wigs," a touring diva impersonation theater show

Mrs. Kasha Davis has performed her one-woman show "There's Always Time for a Cocktail" to critical acclaim at Laurie Beechman Theater in New York, as well as venues in San Francisco, Rochester, London and Brighton in the United Kingdom. She is also an advocate for and frequent performer in Drag Story Hour, a national event bringing drag queens into libraries and theaters to read books to children

Since appearing on RuPaul's Drag Race, Mrs. Kasha Davis is currently starring with Deven Green in World of Wonder Presents Plus television show Tails of the City: Pets 4 Pets. She additionally had a supporting role as Vicki Leaks in the film Hurricane Bianca 2: From Russia with Hate and hosted the film's Los Angeles premiere. The film also includes fellow Drag Race contestants Bianca Del Rio, Katya, Shangela, and Darienne Lake in addition to actresses Rachel Dratch, Wanda Sykes and Janeane Garofalo.

In June 2019, Davis was one of 37 queens to be featured on the cover of New York Magazine.

In 2021, director Angela Washko's documentary film Workhorse Queen premiered at Slamdance Film Festival. The film focuses on Ed Popil's life before and after getting cast on RuPaul's Drag Race.

Personal life 
Edward Popil is married to Steven Levins and is stepfather to his two children, making him one of the few Drag Race contestants with children. The two frequently collaborate on music and video content.

He graduated from Marywood University with a BA in theatre before becoming a principal dancer at the Ballet Theatre of Scranton.

Filmography

Film

Television

Music videos

Web series

Discography

EPs

Singles

As lead artist

As featured artist

References

External links 

 Edward Popil on IMDB
 Mrs. Kasha Davis singles and albums on iTunes

1971 births
Living people
American drag queens
Mrs. Kasha Davis
People from Rochester, New York